Carinodens is an extinct genus of Cretaceous marine lizard belonging to the mosasaur family. "Carinodens" means "keel teeth" and was named in 1969 as a replacement name for Compressidens, "compressed teeth", which was already in use for a gadilidan scaphopod mollusk.

Carinodens is widely considered a sister taxon to Globidens classified within the tribe Globidensini. Like its close relative, Carinodens also possesses distinctive round, blunt teeth for crushing primitive clams and oysters. Most of the cranial elements known from the genus have been recovered from deposits in the Netherlands, with the only known postcranial material being known from deposits of latest Maastrichtian age in Jordan. Fragmentary fossils belonging to an unknown species of Carinodens have been found in Crimea.

Description 

It was closely related to Globidens, though is scantly known in comparison. The holotype specimen consists of an incomplete right dentary and most subsequently referred fossils are isolated teeth. The holotype dentary only preserves the posteriormost teeth, meaning that until recently when more comprehensive material was recovered, most of the dentition of the genus (its most distinctive feature) was unknown.

Carinodens can easily be distinguished from the closely related Globidens by the compressed nature of its teeth and its relatively delicate dentary.

Russell (1967) offered a brief diagnosis (due to the fragmentary nature of the fossils) of the genus, then known as Compressidens: "Small projection of dentary anterior to first dentary tooth. Median dentary teeth bilaterally compressed, bicarinate, subrectangular in lateral view and with pointed apices. Anterior teeth circular in cross-section with strongly recurved pointed apices".

Dentition 
By mosasaur standards, the teeth of Carinodens are unusually heterodont, both in morphology and size. The alveoli show a marked size decrease between teeth #8 and #7, and the teeth themselves change dramatically in both size and morphology between #8 and #7. This is similar to the maxillary teeth of Globidens dakotensis (between positions #5 and #6, though this is less pronounced than in Carinodens) and in Globidens alabamaensis.

Diet 
Carinodens, is like its close relative Globidens, considered to have been a durophagous mosasaur. Because the anteriormost part of the dentary of Carinodens is relatively slender with small pointed tooth crowns, only the posteriormost five teeth actually functioned for crushing food. The anteriormost portion of the dentary was thus likely used for acquiring and handling food rather than crushing it, an idea already suggested by Dollo (1913) during the description of the type species. The maxilla of Carinodens is unknown, which hinders knowledge on the interaction between the lower and upper jaw.

Dollo (1913, 1924) suggested a diet dominated by echinoderms, whereas Lingham-Soliar (1990, 1999) listed a wide array of potential prey items, including belemnites, nautilids, bivalves, gastropods, scaphopods, brachiopods, echinoderms and arthropods. These groups were abundant in the late Cretaceous seas around Maastricht, meaning that their population numbers cannot explain the rarity of Carinodens. It is possible that Carinodens spent most of its life in deep waters, only rarely swimming in shallow seas.

Classification 
Carinodens fraasi was first described and illustrated by Louis Dollo in 1913 as "Globidens fraasi". Dollo later erected a separate genus, "Compressidens" for the species in 1924, recognising the more compressed nature of the teeth in comparison to those of Globidens. Dollo also assigned Bottosaurus belgicus, previously misinterpreted as a species of crocodilian, to the genus as Compressidens belgicus. With the name Compressidens being preoccupied by a scaphopod mollusk, Thurmond (1969) proposed the substitute name Carinodens.

Carinodens is most frequently recovered as a sister taxon to Globidens within the Globidensini tribe in the Mosasaurinae. The cladogram below, covering the Globidensini, is based upon a summary of evolutionary adaptations in the Globidensini featured in Schulp et al. (2004):

It is worth noting that placing Prognathodon within the Globidensini is controversial, and it is most often seen as either a more basal mosasaurine or as part of its own tribe, the Prognathodontini.

The primary feature distinguishing the two recognised species, C. fraasi and C. belgicus is found in their dentition. The teeth of C. fraasi are unicuspid and the teeth of C. belgicus are tricuspid. Carinodens fossils from Jordan, consisting of an almost complete skull with at least 24 teeth still occupying their natural locations, a complete neck vertebral series as well as several back vertebrae, and front paddles were reported by Kaddumi (2009). In addition to the dentary, maxillary, and premaxillary teeth, several small pterygoid teeth were also recovered from the same specimen. Kaddumi (2009) fully described the remains and referred them to a new species of Carinodens. Based on the remarkable dental heterodonty exhibited in the new species from Jordan, several previously not considered prey items may be postulated for Carinodens (Kaddumi 2009).

References 

Mosasaurines
Mosasaurs of Europe
Mosasaurs of Asia
Fossil taxa described in 1969